"Lice Capades" is the third episode of the eleventh season of the American animated television series South Park. The 156th episode of the series overall, it first aired on Comedy Central in the United States on March 21, 2007. In the episode, all the students at South Park Elementary are checked for head lice and, to his horror, Clyde discovers that he has lice. He tries to hide it from his classmates, knowing they will make fun of (if not torture) him. The episode was written and directed by series co-creator Trey Parker.

Plot
Mrs. Garrison announces to the class that, due to another school having a head lice problem, every student must now be checked. During the check, Clyde is informed that he has head lice, much to his horror. The nurse gives him a note and he goes to the doctor, who prescribes Clyde a special lice shampoo to deal with the problem, but Clyde remains shocked and embarrassed by the situation and lies about it, knowing the other kids are going to bully and pick on him. Meanwhile, from on top of Clyde's head, the lice are living peacefully in a village until one of them, Travis, witnesses the nurse parting Clyde's hair and sees her as a gigantic eye in the sky staring down at him. Travis tells the other lice the "world" has become aware of them and is angry, that they need to move away, but he is ridiculed by everyone. That night, Clyde washes his hair with the shampoo, killing most of the lice. Travis' wife Kelly is killed, but Travis, their baby Hope and a handful of other lice, including the villainous Vice President, Greg, survive.

The next day in class, the kids ask Mrs. Garrison if somebody did have lice. Mrs. Garrison tells the children that someone had lice but refuses to reveal who because of a policy in school. The kids begin to suspect each other- Cartman due to his penchant to blame everyone else, Kyle due his penchant for wanting to blame Cartman, Stan after he tries to defuse the situation, and Kenny even though he didn't do anything- and plot to discover who had the lice in order to both evade and humiliate them. Cartman eventually devises a test to tell who had head lice (a parody of the blood test in the 1982 horror film The Thing), something even Kyle points out and calls Cartman out on. Cartman rigs it to frame Kenny, who he assumes must have lice because Kenny is poor and therefore has bad hygiene as, according to Cartman, only poor people get lice. Kenny flees the room, and Clyde is somewhat relieved.

Back on Clyde's head, the few survivors of the disaster gather and Travis tells them that they must flee the world for another better one that welcomes them, and to do so they must go to the "Forbidden Zone" beyond the forest. While other lice stay behind to find other survivors, Travis, Greg and another survivor go to the "Forbidden Zone". There, Greg fatally shoots the other survivor. He then aims at Travis and tells him he will rebuild the village and finally become President and that there's no room for deep thinkers like him. While taunting Travis (at the same time shooting both his kneecaps), Greg mocks Travis' theories of a living world that's self-aware and conscious. To drive home his point, he shoots the "ground" several times, stating that if the world was indeed alive it would feel the gunshots and react. In that moment Clyde reaches up to the back of his neck, picking up the surprised and screaming Greg and tossing him away to his death. The wounded Travis can do little more but laughs up to the sky, as he clutches tightly his precious nit.

The boys manage to track Kenny down to the park, where they intend to punish him, each carrying a bar of soap in a sock as their weapon. They invite Clyde to come. Before Clyde leaves, filled with guilt, he calls Mrs. Garrison to warn her of Kenny's danger. Kenny is caught in the park, stripped to his underwear and given what Cartman calls a "sock bath" (i.e. washed with the soap, then dried with the socks). Then, Kyle forces everyone to stop, saying that he cannot go through with it and can't let Kenny take the fall for him, and admits that he's the one who had lice - much to Clyde's surprise. Stan, then Cartman, also come forward, admitting to the same thing; just then, Mrs. Garrison shows up and tells the boys that everyone (boys and girls alike) in the class had head lice, as it spreads extremely quickly, and then leaves while calling the kids "dumbasses." In response to this, the boys nevertheless proceed with the sock bath for Kenny's lies and denial of having lice.

Travis, near apparent death, sees an apparition of Kelly in the sky flying towards him like an 'angel' (a soprano in the music score sings "Pie Jesu" from Fauré's "Requiem".) The apparition is a housefly, and Travis, still tightly holding his child, grabs on to one of its legs before it flies off. The fly finally lands on another world/body and Travis is glad to be welcomed by its populace, larger, red-brown-colored lice at a much grander, well-established city; and is told they have lived in peace for generations, having "never been disturbed". The shot zooms out from the 'trees' and reveals the city to be on the pubic area of Angelina Jolie.

Reception
IGN rated this episode 7.5 out of 10: "South Park often parodies the overblown drama found in Hollywood blockbuster movies, and this is [sic] episode is a disaster parody of sorts...It seems like the episode had larger ambitions, but becomes bogged down in the parody bit with the lice." For the week of March 19 to March 25, 2007, this episode of South Park was the 13th-most-watched cable program, with 3.1 million viewers.

References

External links
 "Lice Capades" Full episode at South Park Studios
 

Lice
South Park (season 11) episodes